The Paiute-Shoshone Tribe of the Fallon Reservation and Colony is a federally recognized tribe of Northern Paiute and Western Shoshone Indians in Churchill County, Nevada. Their autonym is Toi Ticutta meaning "Cattail Eaters."

Reservations

The reservation, established in 1887, comprises . In 2005, 1,692 people lived on the reservation. In 2017, 1,499 people were enrolled in the tribe.

Governance 
 the Fallon Paiute Shoshone Tribe's headquarters is located in Fallon, Nevada. The tribe is governed by a seven-person tribal council, with Len George serving as the Tribal Chairperson .

Media 
Numa News is the tribe's monthly newspaper.

Notable tribal members 
 Melissa Melero-Moose, mixed-media artist, curator

Notes

References
 d'Azevedo, Warren L., Volume Editor. Handbook of North American Indians, Volume 11: Great Basin. Washington, DC: Smithsonian Institution, 1986. .
 Pritzker, Barry M. A Native American Encyclopedia: History, Culture, and Peoples. Oxford: Oxford University Press, 2000. .

External links
  Official website

1887 establishments in the United States
American Indian reservations in Nevada
Federally recognized tribes in the United States
Native American tribes in Nevada
Northern Paiute
Populated places established in 1887
Populated places in Churchill County, Nevada
Western Shoshone